Raunio is the eleventh album by the Finnish experimental rock band Circle. 

The album is a mixed and re-arranged ("manipulated") composite of three live shows on consecutive nights in Turku, Jyväskylä and Helsinki. It was re-issued in 2002 by Squealer Records with an extra track, "Raubonmix". A review in Pitchfork called it "a decent album for any newcomer to Circle's work". Alex Henderson, writing for AllMusic, commented on the two different types of music on the album: "Parts of Raunio...are calm, reflective, and mindful of European chanting and spiritual traditions. Other times, however, the Finnish band rocks aggressively, turns up the amps, and engages in some very tripped-out, free-spirited jamming".

Track listing
 Raunio I (6:56)
 Alotus (7:58)
 Raunio II (2:46)
 Kultaa (5:18)
 Raunio III (1:08)
 Lokki (10:59)
 Dedofiktion (7:00)
 Potto (13:17)
 Raunio IV (3:24)
 Raubonmix (11:59)

Personnel
Olli Joukio
Janne Westerlund
Mika Rättö
Jyrki Laiho
Jussi Lehtisalo

References

Circle (band) albums
2001 live albums